Pseudolepis is a genus of leaf beetles in the subfamily Eumolpinae, found in Peninsular Malaysia in the vicinity of Kuala Lumpur. It contains only one species, Pseudolepis squamosa.

The generic name refers to the genus Aulacolepis, which Pseudolepis is related to. The specific name is the Latin for "scaly", referring to the scales covering the dorsum of the body.

References

Eumolpinae
Beetles of Asia
Insects of Malaysia
Monotypic Chrysomelidae genera